

# 
11/5
24kgoldn
3X Krazy
415

A 
A-1
A-Plus
Andre Nickatina
Ant Banks
Askari X
A-Wax

B 
Baby Bash
Bavgate (of *Steady Mobb'n)
B-Legit
Berner
Brotha Lynch Hung
Bishop Lamont
Big Lurch

C 
C-Bo
Casual
Celly Cel
The Click
Clyde Carson
The Conscious Daughters
Cougnut
Cellski

D 
The Dangerous Crew
DarkRoom Familia
Death Grips
The Delinquents
Del the Funky Homosapien
Digital Underground
DJ Shadow
Don Cisco
Droop-E
D-Shot
Dru Down

E 
E-40
E-A-Ski

F 
The Federation
Funk Mobb

G 
G-Eazy
G-Stack (aka Purple Mane)
The Grouch

H 
Hieroglyphics

J 
J-Diggs
The Jacka
Jay Tee
J Stalin
JT the Bigga Figga

K 
Keak da Sneak
Kung Fu Vampire
King Louie
Kriminal
Kyle

L
Lil B
Luniz
Luni Coleone
Lil Coner

M 
Mad Tv
Mac Dre
Mac Mall
Marvaless
MC FatViva
MC Hammer
MC Ride
Messy Marv
Mistah F.A.B.
Mob Figaz
Mozzy

N 
N2Deep
Nef the Pharaoh
Nump
Numskull

O 
OMB Peezy
Opio

P 
Paris
Pep Love
Phesto
Philthy Rich
Pighairlol
Princess Jasmine
P-Lo

R 
Rappin' 4-Tay
Rappin' Ron
RBL Posse
Richie Rich
Rick Rock
Rydah J. Klyde

S 
Sage the Gemini
San Quinn
Saweetie
Seagram
Sean T
Shock G
Souls of Mischief
Spice 1
SOB X RBE

T 
Tajai
The Team
Too Short
Tupac
Totally Insane
Traxamillion
Turf Talk
Tha Truth
Tony B

W 
Watsky

X 
X-Raided

Y 
Yukmouth
Young Dru

Z 
Zendaya
Zion I

 
Northern California